Alexander Alexandrovich Denezhkin (born 14 October 1991) is a Russian professional ice hockey player. He is currently playing with HC Lada Togliatti of the Supreme Hockey League (VHL).

Denezhkin made his Kontinental Hockey League (KHL) debut playing with HC Spartak Moscow during the 2011–12 KHL season.

References

External links

1991 births
Living people
Des Moines Buccaneers players
Krylya Sovetov Moscow players
Oshawa Generals players
Russian ice hockey right wingers
HC Ryazan players
HC Spartak Moscow players
Sokol Krasnoyarsk players
Ice hockey people from Moscow
HC Vityaz players